The 2017 World Sprint Speed Skating Championships were held at the Olympic Oval in Calgary, Alberta, Canada, from 25 to 26 February 2017.

Schedule

Medal summary

Medal table

Medalists

References

External links
Entries, results and announcements
Results

 
World Sprint Championships
2017 in Canadian sports
February 2017 sports events in Canada
2017 Sprint
2017 World Sprint Speed Skating Championships
2017 World Sprint Speed Skating Championships